The Epinay Studios are film production studios located in Epinay in northern Paris. It was a complex with two distinct and separate structures. The earliest was built in 1902 by Eclair Film. A second studio was controlled by the French subsidiary of the German company Tobis Film. These were converted for sound in February 1929. The same year the other studio was acquired by Pathé-Natan.

The launch of the Cité du Cinéma in 2012, also in Seine-Saint-Denis, greatly slowed down interest in the Épinay studios.

References

Bibliography
 Crisp, C.G. The Classic French Cinema, 1930-1960. Indiana University Press, 1993

French film studios